The 2014–15 Croatian Ice Hockey League season was the 24th season of the Croatian Ice Hockey League, the top level of ice hockey in Croatia. KHL Medveščak Zagreb II won the championship by defeating KHL Mladost Zagreb in the final. Many KHL players from Medveščak's top team joined the second team for the playoffs.

Regular season

Playoffs

Semifinals 

KHL Mladost Zagreb - KHL Sisak 2:0
25:2 (3:1, 14:0, 8:1) 	
23:3 (8:0, 7:1, 8:2)
KHL Zagreb - KHL Medveščak Zagreb II 0:2 
3:4 OT (2:0, 1:0, 0:3, 0:1)
1:10 (0:3, 0:4, 1:3)

Final 

 KHL Mladost Zagreb - KHL Medveščak Zagreb II 0:3
 2:7 (1:1, 1:4, 0:2) 
 5:6 (1:4, 1:2, 3:0)
 3:10 (2:3, 0:2, 1:5)

References

External links
Results on eurohockey.com

Cro
Croatian Ice Hockey League seasons
1